Kudair is a village in Anantapur district of the Indian state of Andhra Pradesh. It is the mandal headquarters of Kudair mandal in Anantapur revenue division.

References 

Villages in Anantapur district
Mandal headquarters in Anantapur district